Cercospora solani-tuberosi is a fungal plant pathogen.

References

External links

solani-tuberosi
Fungal plant pathogens and diseases